Golos Sotsial-Demokrata was a Russian-language publication, issued by a section of exiled Mensheviks.

History and profile
Golos Sotsial-Demokrata began publication in February 1908 in Geneva and was then published in Paris from 1909–1911, ceasing in December 1911 with its twenty-sixth issue.

References

1908 establishments in Switzerland
1911 disestablishments in France
Defunct political magazines published in France
Magazines established in 1908
Magazines disestablished in 1911
Magazines published in Paris
Magazines published in Geneva
Russian-language magazines
Political magazines published in Russia
Socialist magazines